Croatia participated at the inaugural edition of the European Games in 2015.

Medal Tables

Medals by Games

Medals by sports

List of medallists

See also
 Croatia at the Olympics

References